Bowshank is a village in the Scottish Borders area of Scotland, close to the A7, beside the Gala Water.

Nearby are Bow Castle Broch, as well as Buckholm, Clovenfords, the Lugate Water, Torsonce and Stow.

See also
List of places in the Scottish Borders
List of places in Scotland

External links

RCAHMS/Canmore entry for Bowshank Tunnel
RCAHMS entry for Bowshank Tunnel
Government website on Waverley Line, Bowshanks
Scottish Parliament, Waverley Railway (Scotland) Bill

Villages in the Scottish Borders